The Augusta Bay is located on the east coast of Sicily, Italy, about 270 nm south-southeast of Naples.

It is the location of the Augusta Bay Port Facility which supports the Sixth Fleet of the US Navy. The facility is distributed  among Porto Megarese, Porto Xifonio and Seno del Priolo.

See also
Augusta-Priolo

References

External links
Augusta Port

Landforms of Sicily
Bays of Italy
Ports and harbours of Italy